The Pennsylvania class of six armored cruisers served in the United States Navy from 1905 to 1927. All six were renamed for cities 1912–1920, to make the state names available for the new battleships beginning with the s. All of these served during World War I, with California (then San Diego) being the only ship of the class to be lost. The remaining five armored cruisers were scrapped between 1930 and 1931 in accordance with the London Naval Treaty.

Design and construction
These ships were ordered in fiscal years 1900 (ACR-4 to ACR-6) and 1901 (ACR-7 to ACR-9) as part of the naval buildup touched off by the Spanish–American War. Together with the four immediately succeeding  ships they were called the "Big Ten". They were originally intended to operate in the battle line with battleships. However, their role was changing even as they entered service. The 1904 report of the Navy's Bureau of Navigation, examining the results of the Russo-Japanese War, noted that "...the work of the armored cruisers was auxiliary to that of the battleships..." and "They can serve with battleships, but they can never take their place". In 1906 the US Navy's battleships were concentrated in the Atlantic, and three or four armored cruisers were assigned to the Asiatic Fleet in the Philippines to counter Japan's rising naval power. By 1912 the rapid development of dreadnought battleships and battlecruisers left the armored cruisers unable to successfully engage the newer capital ships.

Armament
These ships were originally armed with four /40 caliber Mark 5 guns in two twin turrets fore and aft. However, these were replaced with 8-inch/45 caliber Mark 6 guns by 1911 as a result of a gun bursting on Colorado in 1907. Fourteen /50 caliber Mark 6 guns were mounted in casemates on the sides. The large secondary armament, intended to combat torpedo boats, included eighteen /50 caliber rapid fire (RF) guns and twelve 3-pounder RF guns. Two 1-pounder saluting guns and two  torpedo tubes were also carried.

Armor
In the development of these ships Captain Sigsbee, formerly of the ill-fated , successfully argued for adequate armor protection at the expense of speed.

Engineering
The normal coal allowance was 900 tons, but this could be increased to 2,000 tons.

Refits
In 1909–1911 the ships' original 8-inch/40 caliber guns were replaced with four /45 caliber Mark 6 guns in Mark 12 turrets due to a gun bursting on Colorado in 1907. From 1911 the military foremasts were replaced with cage masts. In 1911, Pennsylvania was fitted with an after flight deck for the first landing on a ship by an aircraft. This was a one-off demonstration on 18 January 1911 with pilot Eugene Ely, who had performed the first takeoff from a ship on  two months earlier. From 1915 to the American entry into World War I in April 1917, Huntington and two Tennessee-class ships had catapults for seaplanes (which disabled the after turret) and carried up to four aircraft; Huntington could also tether an observation balloon, which was used during convoy escort duty in the war. However, by late 1917, the aircraft program was cancelled and the catapults removed.

During the US participation in World War I several changes were made to these ships. All but four of the 6-inch guns were removed to arm merchant ships and reduce the potential of flooding through the lower casemates; this was a factor in the loss of San Diego (probably to a mine) in July 1918. The 3-inch single-purpose guns were reduced to ten, while two 3-inch/50 caliber anti-aircraft guns were added. However, the official Ships' Data Book series indicates that by 1921 all of the 6-inch guns were remounted, only to be dismounted again by 1929.

By 1919 the 32 Niclausse boilers in Pittsburgh (ex-Pennsylvania) and Pueblo (ex-Colorado) were replaced by 20 Babcock & Wilcox boilers. By 1921, Pueblo had 16 Babcock & Wilcox boilers, while Pittsburgh had 12 Babcock & Wilcox and eight "modified Niclausse" boilers. In 1922, Pittsburghs forward funnel and the associated boilers were removed, leaving her with 12 Babcock & Wilcox boilers.

In 1922–1923 modernization of the eight survivors of these ships and the Tennessee class was considered but not implemented.

Service
The Pennsylvanias spent the years prior to 1917 patrolling Latin America and the Western Pacific. Colorado landed troops in a 1912 intervention in Nicaragua. Early in the US participation in World War I the ships operated in the South Atlantic and the Pacific, then most were transferred to convoy escort duty in the North Atlantic. Pittsburgh remained in the Pacific, unsuccessfully patrolling for German commerce raiders. While using Huntingtons observation balloon on convoy escort duty on 17 September 1917, the balloon landed in the water due to rough weather, with the basket upside down and submerged. Shipfitter First Class Patrick McGunigal received the Medal of Honor for rescuing the pilot. This is said to be the first action in World War I that resulted in the award of the Medal of Honor. The wreck remains in place. Most of the ships were decommissioned or relegated to virtually stationary roles such as "receiving ship" in the early 1920s; however, Pittsburgh and Huron continued to operate for most or all of that decade. All were sold for scrap in 1930–1931 in compliance with the limits of the London Naval Treaty. Huron survived as a floating breakwater in Powell River, British Columbia until wrecked by a storm in 1961. Her wreck remains in place.

Ships in class

The six ships of the Pennsylvania class were:

The Pennsylvania class was renamed 1912–1920 to free their names for new battleships; they were given the designation CA (armored cruiser) on 17 July 1920 with the USN's adoption of the hull-number system

See also
 – extensive discussion of US armored cruiser development and comparisons with foreign designs
List of cruisers of the United States Navy

References

Bibliography

External links

Pennsylvania-Class armored cruisers (Archive from 16 September 2008)
hazegray.org: US Cruisers List: Armored Cruisers (Pre-1920 ACR Series)
Cruiser photo gallery index at NavSource Naval History

Cruiser classes